Fibrocartilage consists of a mixture of white fibrous tissue and cartilaginous tissue in various proportions.  It owes its inflexibility and toughness to the former of these constituents, and its elasticity to the latter. It is the only type of cartilage that contains type I collagen in addition to the normal type II.

Structure 
The extracellular matrix of fibrocartilage is mainly made from type I collagen secreted by chondroblasts.

Locations of fibrocartilage in the human body 

 secondary cartilaginous joints:
 pubic symphysis
 annulus fibrosis of intervertebral discs
 manubriosternal joint
 glenoid labrum of shoulder joint
 acetabular labrum of hip joint
 medial and lateral menisci of the knee joint
 location where tendons and ligaments attach to bone
 Ulnar Triangular Fibrocartilage complex (TFCC)

Function

Repair 
If hyaline cartilage is torn all the way down to the bone, the blood supply from inside the bone is sometimes enough to start some healing inside the lesion. In cases like this, the body will form a scar in the area using a special type of cartilage called fibrocartilage. Fibrocartilage is a tough, dense, and fibrous material that helps fill in the torn part of the cartilage; however, it is not an ideal replacement for the smooth, glassy articular cartilage that normally covers the surface of joints.

Clinical significance

Degeneration of fibrocartilage is seen in degenerative disc disease.

References

External links
 

Skeletal system
Connective tissue